This article presents an overview of university rankings in Pakistan. Within Pakistan, the Higher Education Commission (HEC) provides official rankings of higher education institutions (HEIs) nationally, based on a multitude of criteria. There are also various magazines, newspapers and international agencies/standards which provide rankings and analysis.
 
According to the 2015 HEI rankings released by the HEC, the top six universities in Pakistan are, in descending order: National University of Sciences and Technology (Pakistan), University of the Punjab (PU), University of central punjab(UCP), Quaid-i-Azam University, University of Agriculture in Faisalabad (UAF) and Aga Khan University (AKU).

As of 2022, total 6 universities were ranked in top 1000 by QS World University Rankings: NUST  (#358), Quaid-i-Azam University (#378), PIEAS (#398), LUMS (#651), UET, Lahore (#801), and University of the Punjab (#801). In rankings for 2023, the number increased to 7, with the addition of University of Peshawar (#801).

National
Up to date, the HEC has published rankings for the years 2006, 2012, 2013, 2014 and most recently 2015. In addition to the top ten and general rankings, independent rankings are also provided for universities and institutes in the categories of agriculture and veterinary science; arts and design; business; engineering and technology; and medicine. The HEC ranking uses five criteria, all of which have specific weightings and are summed to give an aggregate score out of 100. Institutional rankings are determined based on this aggregate score. Each criterion and its weighting is dependent upon a set of sub-components. The five criteria, along with their weighted score and sub-components are summarised below:

 Quality assurance (15) – Standard of M.Phil., M.S. and PhD courses; eligibility criteria for faculty member appointments; plagiarism policy compliance; assessment of Quality Enhancement Cells (QECs) for internal quality assurance; international awards/honours attained by students; affiliation of coursework with national accreditation bodies e.g. NAEAC, NBEAC, NCEAC, PEC and PMDC; latest international rankings of  the university/institute.     
 Teaching quality (30) – Staff to student ratio; ratio of PhD faculty and full-time faculty; faculty training and recruitment; student enrollment ratio and selectivity; national and international awards/recognition attained by faculty members.
 Research (41) – Nationally and internationally registered patents, varieties, technologies, breeds and creative work; university industrial linkages through Offices of Research, Innovation and Commercialisation (ORICs); ratio of PhD students and total PhD output per year; amount of external research grants obtained; amount of travel grants obtained by faculties for presentation of papers abroad; number of papers published in ISI Web of Science impact factor journals and HEC-recognised journals; citations per paper; university h-index; number of W and X category journals published;  internet bandwidth and HEC Digital Library utilisation; number of national and international conferences/seminars/workshops/symposia organised.
 Finance and facilities (10) – Ratio of non-salary expenditures in total budget; amount generated through own resources; amount of budget expended on research and libraries; computers available per student and faculty; number of books and resources in libraries; number of external scholarships received by students.
 Social integration/community development (4) – Community outreach programs and services; international collaborations and student exchange programs; number of international students enrolled and foreign faculty.

Top ten rankings
According to the 2016 HEC rankings, the following comprise the overall top ranking higher education institutions in the country.

Agriculture and veterinary science

Arts and design

Business
According to the 2022 HEC rankings, the following comprise the top ranking business schools in the country.

Computer Sciences (CS), Software Engineering (SE) and Information Technology (IT) 
Rankings for Computer science and information technology Institutes are updated as of 2022.

Engineering and technology
According to the 2022 HEC rankings, the following comprise the top ranking engineering universities in the country.

Medicine
According to the 2022 HEC rankings, the following comprise the top ranking medical schools in the country.

General rankings

Notes:
 Institutions not included in the HEC rankings include distance learning universities, military academies, universities chartered after the 30th of June 2010 and those institutions for which sufficient data is not available.
 Source: Higher Education Commission, as of 23 February 2016.

International rankings

Quacquarelli Symonds (QS)
The QS World University Rankings is one of the most widely referenced international ranking systems. Pakistan is ranked 50th globally in terms of its higher education system's strength. Following is the list of 13 Universities which appeared in 2022 - 2023 edition of QS World University Rankings:

Research Papers in Economics/IDEAS
Research Papers in Economics (RePEc) ranks the top 25% institutions and schools/faculties in the field of economics research, using its IDEAS database. The database takes a number of factors into account, such as item citations, journals and working papers, authorship and field-based ranks. The database rankings are updated on a monthly basis. Provided below are the most recent country rankings for Pakistan:

Notes:
 For the purpose of this article, non-academic institutions ranked in the database have been excluded from this list.
 Source: Pakistan rankings, RePEc/IDEAS as of March 2016.

Round University Ranking
The Round University Ranking, compiled by the RUR Ranking Agency in Russia in partnership with Thomson Reuters, ranks the top 750 universities based on standards of teaching, research, international diversity and financial sustainability. The following Pakistani universities are listed in the 2016 rankings:

 Source: Round University Rankings, as of 2016.

SCImago Institutions Rankings
The SCImago Institutions Rankings (SIR) are published by the SCImago Research Group, a Spanish academic research organisation. The rankings measure universities using indicators such as research, innovation and web visibility. Included below are the 19 Pakistani universities listed in these rankings and their positions in terms of the latter two indicators (as of 2014).

Notes:
 Data for research rankings is not publicly available.
 Source: Innovative Knowledge rankings, Technological Impact rankings, Website rankings and Domain Inbound Links rankings for Pakistan, SCImago Institutions Rankings as of 2014.

Times Higher Education
The Times Higher Education World University Rankings is a prominent publication of university rankings, released by the UK-based Times Higher Education magazine. It includes overall, subject and reputation-wise rankings, 150 Under 50 rankings, as well as two regional rankings: Asia, and BRICS and Emerging Economies. In the 2015–2016 edition, the following ranks were applicable to Pakistani universities:

Notes:
 The 150 Under 50 ranking lists the top 150 world universities which are less than 50 years old.
 Source: World rankings (as of 2016/2017), Asia rankings (as of 2016), BRICS & Emerging Economies rankings (as of 2015/2016) and 150 Under 50 rankings (as of 2016) for Pakistan, Times Higher Education World University Rankings.

UI GreenMetric Ranking
The GreenMetric Ranking of World Universities is published by Universitas Indonesia (UI). It ranks over 400 world universities according to their eco-friendly environment and commitment to sustainability. Three instruments are used as the basis of the ranking criteria: Environment, Economics and Equity. The 2015 edition includes the following overall and indicator-specific world rankings for Pakistani universities:

 Source: Overall rankings , Setting and Infrastructure rankings, Energy and Climate Change rankings, Waste rankings, Water rankings , Transportation rankings, Education rankings  and Campus Setting rankings, UI GreenMetric as of December 2015.

U-Multirank
U-Multirank is an independent ranking system funded by the European Commission under the Erasmus Programme. The ranking is supported by a consortium of academics in Europe. It provides multi-dimensional listings for universities, in terms of academic fields as well as various education-specific indicators. Universities are rated against these indicators using a grading system, ranging from 'A' (very good) to 'E' (weak). The 2016 rankings include the following Pakistani universities along with their grades:

Notes:
 Source Pakistan rankings obtained from university comparisons, U-Multirank as of April 2016.

University Ranking by Academic Performance
The University Ranking by Academic Performance (URAP), developed at the Middle East Technical University in Turkey, ranks the top 2,000 global institutions with an emphasis on research impact and quality, and scientific productivity. It uses indicators such as articles published, citations, total documents, article and citation impact, and international collaboration. The 2015–2016 edition provides the following national, international and regional rankings along with field-based ranks (as of 2014–2015) for Pakistani universities:

Notes:
 The 17th rank is intentionally omitted due to database error.
 Source: Pakistan rankings and Asia rankings (as of 2015–2016); Field-based rankings (as of 2014–2015), University Ranking by Academic Performance.

U.S. News & World Report
In the 2015 edition of top 500 international rankings, the U.S. News & World Report Best Global University Rankings listed the following Pakistani university:

Webometrics
The Webometrics Ranking of World Universities, published by the Spanish Cybermetrics Lab, provides a listing of national, regional and international rankings of universities in Pakistan based on their web presence. Shown below, as per the 2016 edition, are the top 20 rankings only:

 Source: Pakistan rankings, Asia rankings and South Asia rankings, Webometrics as of January 2016.

uniRank
uniRank, formerly 4 International Colleges and Universities (4icu.org), ranks universities and colleges country-wise based on their web popularity and online footprint. It is not an academic ranking. According to its website, uniRank uses an algorithm including web metrics from Moz Domain Authority, Alexa Global Rank, SimilarWeb Global Rank, Majestic Referring Domains and Majestic Trust Flow. The top 10 results in Pakistan include the following universities:

 Source: Pakistan rankings, uniRank as of 2016.

Analysis and criticism

The HEC acknowledges that rankings are "a debatable subject all over the world". It defines its ranking system as a measure to strengthen the quality of higher education, provide a tool for self-assessment, as well as ensure that universities achieve domestic and international competitiveness in education, innovation and research. However, the HEC's rankings have been subject to criticism among educationists and policy-making experts in Pakistan. Some critics claim the rankings give "more weight to quantity than quality" of research, faculty and other key factors.

See also
 List of universities in Pakistan

References

External links
 Quality and Research-Based Ranking of Pakistani HEIs at Higher Education Commission
 HEC University Rankings at Jang Group

Higher Education Commission (Pakistan)
Pakistan education-related lists
Pakistan